Leyla Lydia Tuğutlu (born 29 October 1989) is a Turkish actress, singer, model and beauty pageant titleholder who was crowned Miss Turkey 2008. She represented Turkey at the Miss World 2008 pageant.

Early life 
Leyla Lydia Tuğutlu was born in Berlin in 1989. She is daughter of a Turkish father and of a German mother. After primary school, she took piano and violin lessons in Turkey's Conservatory. During this period she worked in a model agency. Tuğutlu graduated from Anatolian High School and left the conservatory for the modeling. At the same period she was studying German Language and Literature at Istanbul University. She speaks Turkish, English, and German.

She started acting with  leading role in popular youth series "Es-Es". She is known by the role of Candan from the Kızım series, romantic comedy series Tatlı İntikam and recently appeared in the popular Turkish television series Uyanış: Büyük Selçuklu which stars actor like Buğra Gülsoy and Ekin Koç. She played in popular series and films.

Beauty contests 
Leyla Lydia Tuğutlu won the title of Miss Turkey 2008. In December 2008 she attended the Miss World competition which was held in Johannesburg, South Africa where she represented Turkey. She won also the title Best Promising in Best Model of Turkey pageant in 2005. She appeared in Miss Tourism Queen International in China in 2006 and won  International princess  regards. In 2007, she won the TV Fashion Oscar as "The most promising model".

Filmography

References

1989 births
Actresses from Berlin
Living people
Miss World 2008 delegates
Turkish film actresses
Turkish television actresses
Turkish beauty pageant winners
Turkish female models
German people of Turkish descent
Turkish people of German descent